Lethrinus miniatus, the sweetlip emperor, sweetlip swoose or trumpet emperor, is a fish of the family Lethrinidae. It can be found on coral reefs and moderately warm waters in the Western Pacific Ocean, although its primary habitat is the Great Barrier Reef. It can also be found in the coastal regions in the centre of Western Australia.

Its first dorsal (on the back or top of the fish) fin is red, before changing towards the tail to a darker colour. The area around the base of its pectoral fins (on the chest behind the head) is red or orange. The area around its eyes, the corner of its mouth and on parts of the fins on the bottom can also be red or orange.

Sweetlip emperors are carnivorous predators in the reef; however, their main prey are small crustaceans such as crabs, as well as sand dollars and small fish. They also eat most other organisms that live near the bottom of the reef.

Even though sweetlip emperors live at the bottom of the reef, they are found only on the continental shelf where the bottom is sandy and light. They also choose a home near a reef for protection from other predators.

Today, species of emperor in the reef (including the sweetlip emperor) are threatened because they are desired by both commercial fishing operations and pleasure fishers, due to their vibrant colour and delightful taste.

Sweetlip emperors have an unusual breeding and development pattern. Off the coast of Cairns, they spawn almost all the time. Off the coast of Townsville, they mate in June and August, and off the coast in October and November in more southern waters. These different breeding times are due to different water temperatures. Sweetlip emperors can spawn (like eggs that hatch eventually) only in warmer water.

The young live near the shore in seagrass beds and mangrove swamps, where the water is shallow. As they grow older, they begin to move out towards the ocean like the adults. As they grow and get older, their sex changes from female to male.

References

External links
ITIS Report

Lethrinidae
Fish described in 1801